Sardar Muhammad Aslam Bizenjo is a Pakistani politician who was a Member of the Provincial Assembly of Balochistan, from May 2013 to May 2018.

Early life and education
He was born on 1 February 1951 in Khuzdar District.

He has a degree in Bachelor of Arts.

Political career

He was elected to the Provincial Assembly of Balochistan as a candidate of National Party from Constituency PB-34 Khuzdar-II in 2013 Pakistani general election.

References

Living people
Balochistan MPAs 2013–2018
1951 births